Grabia Trzecia  is a village in the administrative district of Gmina Sędziejowice, within Łask County, Łódź Voivodeship, in central Poland.

The village has a population of 50.

References

Grabia Trzecia